Finland competed at the 1992 Summer Paralympics in Barcelona, Spain. 67 competitors from Finland won 25 medals including 8 gold, 6 silver and 11 bronze and finished 17th in the medal table.

See also 
 Finland at the Paralympics
 Finland at the 1992 Summer Olympics

References 

1992
1992 in Finnish sport
Nations at the 1992 Summer Paralympics